The 1900 Illinois lieutenant gubernatorial election was held on November 6, 1900. It saw the reelection of incumbent  Republican William Northcott.

Democratic nomination

Candidates
Elmer A. Perry, member of the Illinois General Assembly

Results

Republican nomination

Candidates
William Northcott, incumbent Lieutenant Governor

Results

General election

See also
1900 Illinois gubernatorial election

References

Bibliography

lieutenant gubernatorial
1900
Illinois
November 1900 events